Willis Creek is a creek in Bryce Canyon National Park, Dixie National Forest, and  the Grand Staircase–Escalante National Monument in Garfield and Kane counties in southern Utah, United States. The creek rises in the national park in Garfield County, but quickly heads south out of the park to enter the national forest and Kane County. The course of the creek then curves to the east and enters the national monument, were it eventually runs through a wash, which in some sections narrows to become a slot canyon. The creek is popular with hikers as the stream is generally 1-2 inches deep and a trail runs the length of the creek. The end of the creek is dry.

Willis Creek was named for William Patterson Willis, an early settler in the area.

See also

 List of rivers of Utah

References

External links

Rivers of Utah
Rivers of Garfield County, Utah
Rivers of Kane County, Utah
Bryce Canyon National Park
Grand Staircase–Escalante National Monument